Alonzo Cooper Rand (December 31, 1831 – July 12, 1885) was an innovator in the petroleum industry and the 11th mayor of Minneapolis, Minnesota.

Life and career
Rand was born in Boston, Massachusetts in 1831 to Charles T. Rand and Deborah F. Rand (née Sprague). As a child he moved to Buffalo, New York where he attended school before going to college at the nearby Gowanda Institute. In September 1853 he married Celine M. Johnson. Rand soon became involved in the oil industry, patenting a unique process for oil refining. He moved around New England and later to Aurora, Illinois perfecting his technique and eventually becoming quite wealthy from it.

In 1874 Rand visited Minneapolis and decided to move there, arriving two years later. With his background he soon became involved in the Minneapolis Gas Light Company (forerunner of Minnegasco, now CenterPoint Energy). Despite being a fairly new resident he was elected mayor in 1878 and would serve two terms. One account noted his term was "a model administration" which provided for the city's growth and better law enforcement. Another suggests that he was elected in absentia and that "he...makes a splendid officer, but thinks it was rather cruel on the part of his friends to drag him from retirement and place him in the mayor's chair, with all its perplexing duties."

On July 12, 1885 Rand was killed along with his wife and several of his children when their boat capsized during a sudden storm on Lake Minnetonka. He is buried at Lakewood Cemetery in Minneapolis.

Electoral history
Minneapolis Mayoral Election, 1878
Alonzo Cooper Rand 2,862	
Michael W. Glenn 2,506		
Albert Lawrence 192
Minneapolis Mayoral Election, 1880
Alonzo Cooper Rand 3,039
Edwin Phillips 1,690

References

1831 births
1885 deaths
Mayors of Minneapolis
People from Boston
Burials at Lakewood Cemetery
19th-century American politicians
Minnesota Republicans